The Palace is an upcoming black comedy film directed by Roman Polanski, who co-wrote the screenplay with Jerzy Skolimowski and Ewa Piaskowska. Produced by and co-starring Luca Barbareschi, the film stars Oliver Masucci, Fanny Ardant, John Cleese, Joaquim de Almeida, Milan Peschel, Bronwyn James, Fortunato Cerlino, and Mickey Rourke.

The film is set to be released theatrically in Italy on April 6, 2023, by 01 Distribution.

Premise
The film takes place on New Year's Eve 1999, where a dinner party at the Gstaad Palace takes an unexpected turn.

Cast
 Oliver Masucci
 Fanny Ardant
 John Cleese
 Joaquim de Almeida
 Luca Barbareschi
 Milan Peschel
 Bronwyn James as Magnolia
 Fortunato Cerlino
 Mickey Rourke
 Alexander Petrov
 Viktor Dobronravov 
 Irina Kastrinidis as Dubravka 
 Olga Kent
 Naike Anna Silipo
 Matthew T. Reynolds
 Teco Celio
 Marina Strakhova
 Danylo Kotov
 Davide Gagliardi

Production

Development
In April 2021, it was announced that Roman Polanski would direct The Palace, a black comedy about guests at the Gstaad Palace on New Year's Eve 1999. Polanski co-wrote the screenplay with fellow Polish director Jerzy Skolimowski, who also co-wrote Polanski's first feature, Knife in the Water (1962). Luca Barbareschi produced the film, under Eliseo Entertainment, alongside RAI Cinema, CAB Productions, and Lucky Bob.

In April 2022, Mickey Rourke, Joaquim de Almeida, John Cleese, Oliver Masucci, Fanny Ardant, Fortunato Cerlino, and Alexander Petrov were cast to star in the film, while Alexandre Desplat and Paweł Edelman served as composer and cinematographer, respectively. Wild Bunch sold the film for distribution in Germany and Spain during the 2022 Cannes Film Festival. 

Barbareschi said he struggled to find financiers in France, where Polanski is based and most of his previous films were produced. Hervé de Luze and Carlo Poggioli served as editor and costume designer, respectively. Ewa Piaskowska served as an additional screenwriter, while Viktor Dobronravov, Olga Kent, Naike Anna Silipo, Matthew T. Reynolds, Teco Celio, Marina Strakhova, and Danylo Kotov were added to the cast.

Filming
Principal photography commenced in February 2022 at the Gstaad Palace in Gstaad, Switzerland, and wrapped in June. Filming was originally set to begin in late 2021. By October 19, 2022, the film was in the final editing stages.

Release
The Palace is set to be theatrically released in Italy on April 6, 2023, by 01 Distribution. The film is also set to be theatrically released in Russia in early 2023. The film was originally set to be theatrically released in Europe in November 2022, and in Italy on January 12, 2023.

References

External links
 

Upcoming films
2023 films
2023 comedy films
2023 independent films
Italian comedy films
Polish comedy films
Swiss comedy films
Films directed by Roman Polanski
Films scored by Alexandre Desplat
Films set in 1999
Films set in hotels
Films set in Switzerland
Films shot in Switzerland
Films with screenplays by Jerzy Skolimowski
Films with screenplays by Roman Polanski
Rai Cinema films